Daniel Bonade (April 4, 1896 – October 30, 1976) was a French classical clarinetist and professor of clarinet. He was the most influential teacher of the first generation of American-born professional clarinetists.

Biography
Daniel Bonade was born in Geneva, Switzerland on April 4, 1896. His father, Louis Bonade, was a clarinetist and received the Premier Prix from the Paris Conservatory in 1870. His mother, Esther Poissenot, was a pianist and a vocalist.

After his father's death, Daniel Bonade began studying the clarinet at age 8 from Ferdinand Capelle. He then studied with Henri Lefebvre, a student of Cyril Rose. In 1910, while studying with Lefebvre, Bonade entered the Paris Conservatory and in 1913 at the age of 18 won the Premier Prix. After completing his education at the Paris Conservatory, Bonade traveled with the Garde Republicane Band as well as freelanced with Ballets Russes, the Sousa Band and other groups.

In 1916, Bonade was offered the principal clarinet position of the Philadelphia Orchestra under the direction of Leopold Stokowski. Bonade was with the Philadelphia Orchestra until 1922 when he took a leave of absence for two years due to salary negotiations. He returned to the Orchestra in 1924 and left in 1930 because he thought the Orchestra was not going to survive the stock market crash.

Bonade took a position with the Columbia Broadcasting Orchestra until 1933 when he was appointed the principal clarinet position of the Cleveland Orchestra. He remained with the Cleveland Orchestra from 1933 to 1941. After his stay in Cleveland, Bonade went on tour with the NBC Symphony Orchestra. Bonade's playing career was cut short by a heart attack when he was advised by medical doctors to stop.

Bonade would devote his time to teaching clarinet students and playing low-pressure gigs. Bonade and his wife retired to France where he died in Cannes on October 30, 1976.

Teaching
Bonade was considered to be one of the greatest clarinet teachers of his time. Bonade taught at Curtis Institute of Music from 1924 to 1940, the Cleveland Institute of Music from 1933 to 1942, and the Juilliard School from 1948 to 1960. Bonade continued teaching privately until his death.

Bonade had many successful students. Many of them received principal positions with orchestras or prestigious teaching positions. His students included: 
 Robert McGinnis - Philadelphia Orchestra, New York Philharmonic 
 Anthony Gigliotti – Philadelphia Orchestra
 Robert Marcellus - Cleveland Orchestra
 Richard Joiner - Colorado Symphony, National Symphony Orchestra, President's Own 
 Emil Schmachtenberg - Cincinnati Symphony
 Mitchell Lurie - Pittsburgh Symphony, Chicago Symphony   
 Bernard Portnoy - Cleveland Orchestra, Philadelphia Orchestra
 David Weber - New York City Ballet, CBS Symphony Orchestra, Juilliard School of Music
 Clark Brody - Chicago Symphony
 Robert Listokin - Radio City Orchestra, Symphony of the Air

Instruments and Equipment
Bonade played on Selmer clarinets through the beginning part of his career until Lefebvre's death when he was given Buffet Clarinets that Lefebvre had inherited from Cyril Rose. Bonade would use these instruments until 1955, when he signed a contract with Leblanc Corporation and promoted their Symphony 3 clarinet line.

In 1957, Bonade received a patent for his ligature design which is still used by many professionals today.

Notes

External links
Victor Morosco on Bonade
Daniel Bonade Papers - Special Collections in Performing Arts at the University of Maryland
The Clarinetist's Compendium

1896 births
1976 deaths
Musicians from Geneva
French classical clarinetists
Swiss emigrants to France
20th-century classical musicians
20th-century French musicians
Cleveland Institute of Music faculty
Musicians of the Philadelphia Orchestra
Swiss expatriates in the United States